The Pontiac Chieftain is an automobile which was produced by Pontiac from 1949 to 1958. The 1949 Chieftain and Streamliner models were the first all new car designs to come from Pontiac in the post World War II years. Previous cars had been 1942 models with minor revisions.

First generation (1949–1954)

In 1949 the A-body Chieftain replaced the Pontiac Torpedo as Pontiac's smaller and lower priced model. However, the newly redesigned B-bodied Pontiac Streamliner was now very similar (if not exact) in dimensions, engines, trim levels and options. This was the first time since 1934 that all Pontiacs had the same wheelbase. They had standard automatic interior lighting.

The Chieftain was initially introduced with four models: Sedan, Sedan Coupe, Business Coupe, and Deluxe Convertible Coupe. In 1950, a Catalina Coupe was added to the range while a station wagon was added in 1952, with the demise of the top-of-the-line Streamliner wagon.

1949 Chieftains came with a choice of four engines:
 a 239.2 cu in L-head 6-cylinder engine making  at 3400 rpm
 a 239.2 cu in L-head 6-cylinder engine making  at 3400 rpm
 a 248.9 cu in L-head 8-cylinder making  at 3800 rpm
 a 248.9 cu in L-head 8-cylinder making  at 3800 rpm

The horsepower differences between each of the 6- and 8-cylinder engines were due to changes in compression ratios.

Some of the more interesting optional items available for the first generation Chieftain included a radio with seven vacuum tubes, tissue dispenser, under seat heaters, and a Remington Auto-Home shaver. In 1951, the horsepower on the 8-cylinder rose to 116. The Chieftain came with a gas gauge, ammeter, oil pressure gauge, and a temperature gauge which had marks for 160, 180, and 220 degrees Fahrenheit.

For the 1952 model year, Pontiac discontinued the Streamliner leaving the Chieftain as their only offering. The Chieftain continued with the 120 inch wheelbase. Engine offerings were basically the same except for the 8-cylinder which got a .2 cubic inch enlargement. Horsepower did increase by 10 on the six-cylinder and by 15 on the eight-cylinder. Also, a red light to remind the driver that the parking brake was on was new. In the May 1952 issue of Popular Mechanics, the Chieftain was rated 14.9 seconds for a 0-60 mph time. Front head room was 36 inches, while rear head room was 35.75 inches.

In 1953, Pontiac came with a new body style, offering a  wheelbase, and sleeker lines. The windshield was now one piece, and a panoramic rear window was standard. Pontiacs sported accentuated bubbled-up fins in the rear for the first time in 1953. The six-cylinder engine was standard. There was a lower-equipped Chieftain Special and a better-equipped Chieftain Deluxe line, as well as the Custom Catalina two-door hardtop coupe. A light-up plastic Chief Pontiac hood ornament that illuminated with the headlights adorned the front end.

The Star Chief was added to the Pontiac line in 1954 and the Chieftain was moved down to entry level status. Both cars were built on the A-body shell, but the new Star Chief had an  extension added to its frame. The six-cylinder engines remained unchanged.

Pontiac was the last GM division to abandon its prewar inline eight engines as Oldsmobile and Cadillac had adopted modern OHV V8s in 1949 and Buick in 1953. The 1953-54 Pontiacs had been meant for the division's new OHV 287 V8; however, Buick division managers succeeded in delaying its launch until 1955 to avoid upstaging their "Nailhead" Buick V8.

Partially because of competition from Chevrolet, Oldsmobile, and Buick, and partially because Pontiac still lacked a V8, total sales fell by 30% in 1954.

Also in 1954, power brakes, "power lift" windows (only for the front doors), as well as air-conditioning were offered as extra cost options for the first time. The 1954 Pontiacs have the distinction of the first production car in the US to have an air conditioning system in the modern sense with in-dash controls. In addition, a far more responsive and fully adjustable front seat was added.

Second generation (1955–1957)

The 1955 model Chieftains featured completely new chassis, body and engine. The engine was the biggest news as this was Pontiac's first V8 called the Strato Streak V8. The last time Pontiac offered a V8 was in 1932 when the Oakland Model 301 with a flathead V8 was renamed Pontiac. Later in the year, a 200-horespower four-barrel version was added. Six cylinder models did not return and the 1955 lineup was V8-only. A six-cylinder model had been considered, but Pontiac management decided not to retain it due to slow sales—six-cylinder Pontiacs had accounted for only around 10-15% of volume since 1951. The traditional "Silver Streak" appearance five-chrome strips running down the hood and trunk were updated with a twin-stripe design.

The biggest change for 1956 was again in the engine. Horsepower made a considerable increase, jumping to 192 and 205 respectively. Otherwise, the 1956 model Chieftains received only minor updates. A padded safety dashboard was added as an option. Sales for 1956 fell off by as much as 20% over record-setting 1955, in part due to tighter credit guidelines instituted by American banks that year.

New "Star Flight" styling graced the 1957 Chieftains. This new theme included missile shaped side trim, extended rear fenders with V-shaped tips, lower hoods and massive bumpers. A new Super Chief sub-series debuted within the Chieftain line. These were the meant to be the top-of-the-line Chieftain models. Sales were 58.02% of all Pontiacs in 1957. The first "Tri-Power" Pontiac engines were offered. Once again the Pontiac V8 was enlarged. This generation didn't experience the popularity as much as the Chevrolet Tri-Five during the same years, even though the models were very similar.

Australian production
The 1957 Pontiac, badged as the Pontiac Super Chief, was also assembled in Australia, by General Motors-Holden.

Third generation (1958)

Chieftains went through another major styling change in 1958. All models were given honeycomb grilles, quad head and tail lamps, concave rear fenders. The Super Chief sub-series was promoted to full model status leaving just the standard array of Chieftains as the entry level Pontiac. The "Sportable" transistor radio became an option (a portable, removable radio), along with air-suspension and a limited slip differential.

As in years past, the V8 engine was enlarged. The 1958 models were the last Chieftains to be produced. It was replaced with the all-new Catalina in 1959.

References

Chieftain
Rear-wheel-drive vehicles
Full-size vehicles
Coupés
Convertibles
Sedans
Station wagons
1940s cars
1950s cars
Motor vehicles manufactured in the United States